The Heart of America Sports Attractions, or "NWA Central States" version of the NWA North American Tag Team Championship was a secondary Tag team championship promoted by the Heart of America Sports Attraction promotion, a National Wrestling Alliance territory based out of Kansas City, Missouri and was defended in Missouri, Kanasas and the surrounding states. The Championship was active from 1963 until 1973, originally designed to be a replacement for the NWA Central States Tag Team Championship and after 10 years was replaced with the Central States version of the NWA World Tag Team Championship. Because the championship was a professional wrestling championship, it was not won or lost competitively but instead by the decision of the bookers of a wrestling promotion. The championship was awarded after the chosen team "won" a match to maintain the illusion that professional wrestling is a competitive sport.

Documentation shows that a total of 44 individuals formed 39 different teams for a total of 58 Championship reigns, possibly more as there are periods where the championship history was not clearly documented. The first champions were the team of Sonny Myers and Pat O'Connor and the final champions were Great Togo and Tokyo Joe. With Togo and Joe's victory the NWA North American Tag Team Championship was immediately replaced with the Central States version of the NWA World Tag Team Championship. Due to the replacement Togo and Joe's reign is the shorted with 0 minutes. The longest team reign was 267 as "Bulldog" Bob Brown and Bob Geigel held the championship from September 22, 1966 until June 16, 1967. Brown and Geigel are the team with the most reigns, five in total and Bob Geigel is the person with the most individual reigns, twelve in total.

Title history

Team reigns by combined length
Key

Individual reigns by combined length
Key

See also
National Wrestling Alliance
NWA World Tag Team Championship (Central States version)
NWA Central States Tag Team Championship
NWA North American Tag Team Championship

Footnotes

References
General references

Specific references

Heart of America Sports Attractions championships
National Wrestling Alliance championships
Tag team wrestling championships